Thomas Borchert (born 20 July 1966 in Essen, Germany) is a German actor, singer, and songwriter. He has performed especially in musical theatre.

Biography 
In 1988, Borchert, with his rock band "Cakewalk", won a prize in a music festival sponsored by the German broadcasting network NDR. He finished high school that same year, then went to the Stage School of Music, Dance and Drama in Hamburg. His first professional role was as Rum Tum Tugger in the Andrew Lloyd Webber musical Cats, in 1990-1991. Recently, he appeared as Maxim de Winter in a Stuttgart production of the musical Rebecca.

The musical The Count of Monte Cristo, in which Thomas plays the title role, was written especially for him by composer Frank Wildhorn in 2009. He was voted "Best Actor in a Musical 2014/15" by the readers of the German Magazine "Musicals". As a singer and pianist, he has recorded several CDs and has often discussed with concerts in Germany, Austria and Switzerland.

Borchert married the violinist Rebecca Thümer in 2005 in Hamburg. He has a son Jonas from his first marriage. He has been married to the musical performer and actress Navina Heyne since the summer of 2018.

Career 
 1990 - 1991: Cats - as Rum Tum Tugger
 1991: You're a Good Man, Charlie Brown (Hamburg) - as Snoopy
 1991: The Rocky Horror Show (Hamburg) - as Frank N. Furter
 1992: Jesus Christ Superstar - as Judas
 1993 - 1994: Elisabeth  (Vienna) - as Luigi Lucheni
 1994 - 1996: Buddy – The Buddy Holly Story (Hamburg) - as Buddy Holly
 1996 - 1997: Evita (Schwäbisch Hall) - as Ché Guevara
 1997 - 1998: Elisabeth (Vienna) - as Luigi Lucheni
 1998 - 1999: Les Misérables (Duisburg) - as Jean Valjean
 1999 - 2000: Mozart! (Vienna) as Leopold Mozart
 2000 - 2001: Mozart! (Vienna) as Count Hieronymus von Colloredo
 2001 + 2002: Judy - Somewhere over the Rainbow (Vienna) - all principal male roles
 2001 - 2003: Jekyll & Hyde (Vienna) - as Henry Jekyll & Edward Hyde
 2002: Divas (Vienna) - as Herb Hammerschmidt, King of Entertainment
 2003: A Midsummer Night's Dream (Rosenburg) - as Oberon & Theseus
 2003 - 2005: Dance of the Vampires (Hamburg) - as Graf von Krolock
 2004: Elisabeth (Trieste operetta festival) - as Death
 2005 - 2006: Dracula, the Musical (St. Gallen) - as Count Dracula
 2005: The Phantom of the Opera (Essen) - as The Phantom
 2006: Best of Musical (Tour) - as a soloist
 2006 - 2008: Dance of the Vampires (Berlin) - as Graf von Krolock
 2007: Best of Musical (Tour) - as a soloist
 2007: Dracula, the Musical (Graz music festival) - as Count Dracula
 2008: Novecento - Die Legende vom Ozeanpianisten (Hamburg) - als Novecento
 2008: Gigi - Das Musical (London) - als Gaston
 2008: Novecento - The Legend of the Red Pianist (Tour) - as Novecento
 2009: The Count of Monte Cristo (St. Gallen) - as Edmond Dantès
 2009 - 2011 Dance of the Vampires (Vienna) - as Graf von Krolock
 2011: Rebecca (Stuttgart) - as Maxim de Winter
 2012: Dance of the Vampires (Berlin) - as Graf von Krolock
 2014: Artus-Excalibur (St. Gallen) - as Merlin
 2018 - 2019: Dance of the Vampires (St-Petersburg) - as Graf von Krolock
 2021 Dracula, the Musical (Ulm) - as Count Dracula
 2022: Dance of the Vampires (St-Petersburg) - as Graf von Krolock

Discography (selected works) 
 Jim Steinman: Tanz der Vampire. Markus Tüpker, Essen [2004]
 Deluxe. Markus Tüpker, Essen / Alive, Cologne (Vertrieb) [2004]
 Frank Wildhorn: Jekyll & Hyde (highlights). BMG Ariola, Munich [u. a.] [2002]
 Buddy. Sony Music Entertainment, Frankfurt am Main [1994]

Awards 
Borchert won the 2002 German Musical Award for best actor for his performance in the title roles of Jekyll & Hyde.

References

External links 
 Thomas Borchert Infoservice
 

1966 births
Living people
German male musical theatre actors
Actors from Essen
German rock singers
Musicians from Essen